The 1998 GP Ouest-France was the 62nd edition of the GP Ouest-France cycle race and was held on 30 August 1998. The race started and finished in Plouay. The race was won by Pascal Hervé of the Festina team.

General classification

References

1998
1998 in road cycling
1998 in French sport